Crk-like protein is a protein that in humans is encoded by the CRKL gene.

Function 

v-CRK avian sarcoma virus CT10-homolog-like contains one SH2 domain and two SH3 domains.  CRKL has been shown to activate the RAS and JUN kinase signaling pathways and transform fibroblasts in a RAS-dependent fashion.  It is a substrate of the BCR-ABL tyrosine kinase and plays a role in fibroblast transformation by BCR-ABL.  In addition, CRKL has oncogenic potential.

CrkL together with Crk participates in the Reelin signaling cascade downstream of DAB1.

Interactions 

CRKL has been shown to interact with:

 Abl gene, 
 BCAR1, 
 BCR gene, 
 CBLB, 
 CD117, 
 CD34, 
 Cbl gene, 
 Dock2, 
 EPOR, 
 GAB1,
 GAB2, 
 INPP5D, 
 MAP4K1, 
 MAP4K5, 
 NEDD9, 
 PIK3R2, 
 Paxillin 
 RAPGEF1, 
 RICS, 
 STAT5A, 
 Syk,  and
 WAS.

See also 
Crk

References

Further reading

External links